The 1969 Asian Champion Club Tournament was the 2nd edition of the annual Asian club football competition hosted by Asian Football Confederation. Ten domestic league champions from ten countries competed in the tournament. The tournament was held in Bangkok, Thailand and ten clubs were split in two groups of five. The group winners and the runners up advanced to semifinals.

Maccabi Tel Aviv (ISR) defeated Korean club Yangzee FC (KOR) and became the second Israeli club to win the competition.

Group stage

Group A

Group B

Knockout stage

Semi-finals

Third-place match

Final

References

External links
Mulcahy, Enda; Karsdorp, Dirk. "Asian Club Competitions 1968/69". RSSSF.

1
Asian Club Tournament
1969
International club association football competitions hosted by Thailand